Catoptria furciferalis is a moth in the family Crambidae. It was described by George Hampson in 1900. It is found in Russia (Ussuri).

References

Crambini
Moths described in 1900
Moths of Asia